Q-Tips is a brand of cotton swab.

Q-Tip may also refer to:

 Q-Tip (musician), an American rapper
 Q-Tips (band), an English band

See also
QTIP Trust, a type of financial planning tool